Suwon Samsung Bluewings is a South Korean professional football club based in Suwon, South Korea, who currently play in the K League Classic. Suwon Samsung Bluewings' first participation in Asian competition was during the 1999 season, when they competed in the Asian Club Championship, their first match was against PSIS Semarang of Indonesia.

Suwon Samsung Bluewings have won the AFC Champions League two times. Their most recent participation in the competition was in 2015.

Matches

Competition

Friendly

Record

By season

By competition

By nation

References

Suwon Samsung Bluewings
South Korean football clubs in international competitions